Tobias Slotsager (born 1 January 2006) is a Danish professional footballer who plays as a centre-back for OB in the Danish Superliga. He also represents the Danish under-17 national team.

Youth player
As a kid Slotsager started in Morud IF, the local football club in the small city Morud, just outside of Odense. He was an obvious talent, and at the age of 13, he moved to Odense Boldklub. On his 15th birthday, he signed a three-year contract. Beside his successful youth career in OB, he was promoted as captain of the Danish U-16 national team.

Club career
At the age of only 16, Slotsager made his professional debut on 21 May 2022 against Vejle where he got 11 minutes on the pitch. Later that year, he signed a professional contract with OB on 12 August 2022.

References

2006 births
Living people
Danish men's footballers
Association football forwards
Danish Superliga players
Odense Boldklub players